The London Mathematical Society (LMS) is one of the United Kingdom's learned societies for mathematics (the others being the Royal Statistical Society (RSS), the Institute of Mathematics and its Applications (IMA), the Edinburgh Mathematical Society and the Operational Research Society (ORS).

History

The Society was established on 16 January 1865, the first president being Augustus De Morgan.  The earliest meetings were held in University College, but the Society soon moved into Burlington House, Piccadilly.  The initial activities of the Society included talks and publication of a journal.

The LMS was used as a model for the establishment of the American Mathematical Society in 1888.

Mary Cartwright was the first woman to be President of the LMS (in 1961–62).

The Society was granted a royal charter in 1965, a century after its foundation.  In 1998 the Society moved from rooms in Burlington House into De Morgan House (named after the society's first president), at 57–58 Russell Square, Bloomsbury, to accommodate an expansion of its staff.

In 2015 the Society celebrated its 150th Anniversary. During the year the anniversary was celebrated with a wide range of meetings, events, and other activities, highlighting the historical and continuing value and prevalence of mathematics in society, and in everyday life.

Membership
Membership is open to those who are interested in mathematics. Currently, there are four classes of membership, namely: (a) Ordinary, (b) Reciprocity, (c) Associate, and (d) Associate (undergraduate). In addition, Honorary Members of the Society are distinguished mathematicians who are not normally resident in the UK, who are proposed by the Society's Council for election to Membership at a Society Meeting.

LMS Activities
The Society publishes books and periodicals; organises mathematical conferences; provides funding to promote mathematics research and education; and awards a number of prizes and fellowships for excellence in mathematical research.

Grants

The Society supports mathematics in the UK through its grant schemes. These schemes provide support for mathematicians at different stages in their careers. The Society’s grants include research grants for mathematicians, early career researchers and computer scientists working at the interface of mathematics and computer science; education grants for teachers and other educators; travel grants to attend conferences; and grants for those with caring responsibilities.

Awarding grants is one of the primary mechanisms through which the Society achieves its central purpose, namely to 'promote and extend mathematical knowledge’.

Fellowships

The Society also offers a range of Fellowships: LMS Early Career Fellowships; LMS Atiyah-Lebanon UK Fellowships; LMS Emmy Noether Fellowships and Grace Chisholm Young Fellowships.

Society lectures and meetings

The Society organises an annual programme of events and meetings. The programme provides meetings of interest to undergraduates, through early career researchers to established mathematicians. These include LMS-Bath Mathematical Symposia, Lecture Series (Aitken/Forder, Hardy, Invited), Research Schools, LMS Prospects in Mathematics Meeting, Public Lectures, Society Meetings, LMS Undergraduate Summer Schools and Women in Mathematics Days.

Publications
The Society's periodical publications include five journals:
Bulletin of the London Mathematical Society (1969–present)
Journal of the London Mathematical Society (1926–present)
Proceedings of the London Mathematical Society (1865–present)
Transactions of the London Mathematical Society (2014–present)
Journal of Topology (2006 – present)

It also publishes the journal Compositio Mathematica on behalf of its owning foundation,  Mathematika on behalf of University College London and copublishes Nonlinearity with the Institute of Physics.

It also co-publishes four series of translations: Russian Mathematical Surveys, Izvestiya: Mathematics and Sbornik: Mathematics (jointly with the Russian Academy of Sciences and Turpion), and Transactions of the Moscow Mathematical Society (jointly with the American Mathematical Society).

Books

The Society publishes two book series, the LMS Lecture Notes and LMS Student Texts.

Previously it published a series of Monographs and (jointly with the American Mathematical Society) the History of Mathematics series.

An electronic journal, the LMS Journal of Computation and Mathematics ceased publication at the end of 2017.

Prizes
The named prizes are:
 De Morgan Medal (triennial) — the most prestigious
 Pólya Prize (two years out of three)
 Louis Bachelier Prize (biennial)
 Senior Berwick Prize
 Senior Whitehead Prize (biennial)
 Naylor Prize and Lectureship
 Berwick Prize
 Anne Bennett Prize
 Senior Anne Bennett Prize
 Fröhlich Prize (biennial)
 Shephard Prize
 Whitehead Prize (annual)
Hirst Prize

In addition, the Society jointly with the Institute of Mathematics and its Applications awards the David Crighton Medal and Christopher Zeeman Medal on alternating years. The LMS also awards the Emmy Noether Fellowship.

List of presidents
Source:

See also

 American Mathematical Society
 Edinburgh Mathematical Society
 European Mathematical Society
 List of Mathematical Societies
 Council for the Mathematical Sciences
 BCS-FACS Specialist Group

References

External links

 London Mathematical Society website
 A History of the London Mathematical Society
 MacTutor: The London Mathematical Society

 
Clubs and societies in London
Education in the London Borough of Camden
Learned societies of the United Kingdom
Mathematical societies
Mathematics education in the United Kingdom
Organisations based in the London Borough of Camden
Organizations established in 1865
Science and technology in London
1865 establishments in England